No Means No may refer to:

"No means no", an anti-rape slogan that emphasizes sexual consent
Nomeansno, a former Canadian punk rock band
"No Means No", an episode of All About Us from 2001
"No Means No", an episode of Campus Ladies from 2006
"No Means No", a song by Michael Monroe from his 1999 album Life Gets You Dirty
"No Means No", a 2003 single by Anisha Nicole
"No Means No", a single by Ricky J 
No Means No (film), an Indo-Polish film

See also
Yes Means Yes, a 2008 feminist book